Joel Nathan Cummins (born January 12, 1975, in La Grange, Illinois) is an American musician, and founding member/keyboardist for progressive rock band Umphrey's McGee.

Cummins tours full-time with Umphrey's McGee, playing a range of shows each year, including sold-out performances at New York's Beacon Theatre, Colorado's Red Rocks Amphitheatre and The Wiltern in Los Angeles. The group also regularly performs American festivals such as Bonnaroo, Austin City Limits Festival, Electric Forest & Summer Camp Music Festival. International appearances have included Jam in the Dam in Amsterdam, Byron Bay Blues Fest in Australia and Fuji Rock Fest in Japan.

Biography

Cummins, along with Brendan Bayliss, Mike Mirro and Ryan Stasik, formed the band in December 1997. Cummins and Mirro were members of University of Notre Dame band Stomper Bob, which split up around the same time as another local band, Tashi Station (which included Bayliss and Stasik).

Cummins began studying classical piano more than 25 years ago and, along with several keyboards, performs with a grand piano at Umphrey's McGee concerts.

In 1995, he released a solo piano album, Suspended in Time: An Epic, featuring originals such as the future Umphrey's McGee classic Orfeo and covers such as Phish's Magilla.

In 2001, Cummins released an electronic keyboard-based album, Common Sense, which featured Umphrey's McGee guitarist Jake Cinninger on drums for most tracks. The band would later use two of the tracks, The Triple Wide and In Violation of Yes, in their concert repertoire.

In addition to playing in Umphrey's McGee, Cummins writes and plays with a number of other bands.  He is a member of progressive-rock tinged OHMphrey along with Chris Poland (Megadeth) and two members of Umphrey's McGee.  Joel is a member of Digital Tape Machine, a more electronic Chicago-based group.  Cummins also performs with the improvisational groups The Everyone Orchestra, Kick the McGee, North Indiana All Stars and Banyan, with Stephen Perkins (Jane's Addiction), Nels Cline (Wilco) and Mike Watt (Minutemen, Firehose, Stooges). He has also recently been featured on several occasions as a guest keyboardist for Indiana-based livetronica group Cosby Sweater.

He has also collaborated with artists such as Huey Lewis, Joshua Redman, Mavis Staples, Phil Lesh, Buddy Guy, Skrillex, Robby Krieger of The Doors, Damian Marley, Warpaint, Thundercat, ASAP Ferg, Koko Taylor, Sinéad O'Connor, Bela Fleck, Victor Wooten, Warren Haynes, Bob Weir, Les Claypool, John Oates, Big Light, Adrian Belew, Ray White & Lee Oskar.

Cummins married Dasha Davis in May 2010 and the couple resides in Los Angeles.

Cummins often plays as part of the Zappa tribute Cosmik Playground at TRiP Bar in Santa Monica California along with Arthur Barrow and others.

Discography 
 Suspended in Time: An Epic (1995)
 Common Sense (2001)

References 

Umphrey's McGee members
20th-century American keyboardists
Musicians from Chicago
1973 births
Living people
University of Notre Dame alumni
21st-century American keyboardists
OHMphrey members